Scenechronized is an album by the progressive bluegrass Maryland band The Seldom Scene. 

It was nominated for the Best Bluegrass Album Grammy in 2007.

Track listing
 Hometown Blues (Steve Earle) 3:07
 Heart and Soul (David Norris) 3:18
 This Morning at Nine (Sidney Campbell) 2:31
 A Hundred and Ten in the Shade (John Fogerty) 4:03
 Katie Dear (Public Domain) 4:07
 Sweetest Love (Carter Stanley) 2:27
 Don't Bother with White Satin (John Duffey, Ann Hill) 3:00
 Mama Tried (Merle Haggard) 2:09
 You Remind Me of the Blues (Paul Craft) 2:25
 Please Be with Me (Scott Boyer) 3:24
 Sad Old Train (Donna Hughes) 2:54
 Tomorrow Is a Long Time  (Bob Dylan) 3:58
 Too Bad You're No Good  (Paul Craft, Cadillac Holmes) 2:47

Personnel
 Dudley Connell - vocals, guitar, mandolin
 Lou Reid - mandolin, vocals
 Ben Eldridge - banjo, guitar, vocals
 Fred Travers - Dobro, guitar, vocals
 Ronnie Simpkins - bass, vocals

with
 Chris Eldridge - guitar

References

External links
Official site

2007 albums
The Seldom Scene albums
Sugar Hill Records albums